9StreamLIVE was a panel television program produced by Nine News that was streamed exclusively online. It was hosted by Rob McKnight. It was a spin-off of previous Nine News live streams and behind the scenes videos uploaded to YouTube.

Format
The show consisted of Rob McKnight (who hosted the show) and three other panel guests (usually Nine News reporters/presenters or journalists). McKnight introduced news stories and asks for opinion from the panel members. McKnight also encouraged viewers to share their opinion via social media (which was shown on a ticker and some selected feedback was read on air).

Segments
There were a number of regular segments:
Clip of the Week- Showed a funny or interesting clip sourced from the Internet.
Trending on Twitter- Showed the top 5 trending Twitter topics.
NineMSN Top 5- Showed the current top 5 most popular NineMSN articles.
ARIA Chart- Played portions of music videos that were in the top 5 on the ARIA Singles Chart.
Top 5 Box Office Countdown- Played portions of the top five grossing films on the Australian Box Office
Backend Quickies- Done towards the end of the show. McKnight quickly introduced a number of news stories and asked the panel for opinions.

Series overview
9StreamLIVE began on Tuesday January 29, 2013 at 7:30pm AEDT. Two weeks later the show moved to the new time slot of 8pm AEDT (to accommodate other studio productions). Season One ran for 8 episodes with the final episode of the season airing Tuesday March 16.  The first episode of the second season was originally intended to air on April 16 but was cancelled due to studio unavailability as a result of the Boston Marathon bombing.

The final episode aired on 28 May 2013. The show did not return the next week as McKnight was preparing to move to Network Ten to executive produce the mid-morning talk show Studio 10.

Episode list

Contributors
Each week Rob was joined by three different panelists. Throughout the duration of the series many of the guests were from the Nine Network, and various Comedians and Newspaper Columnists. A full list of those who appeared on 9StreamLIVE are listed below:

Special events
Prior to the live stream on February 19, 2013, the studio output was switched out live 30 minutes before the show allowing the audience to watch Rob and the guests prepare and rehearse the show. This "pre-show" was never included in the complete episode that was uploaded to YouTube. During the final episode of Season One, a few seconds of the "pre-show" were shown in the "Year that Was" segment. 
Since the launch of series 2, the pre-show became a regular feature.

On 30 April 2013 the show was presented from the QTQ-9 studios in Brisbane in front of a live studio audience.

On 21 May 2013 the BBC uploaded a clip from the show on the official Doctor Who YouTube where McKnight interviews himself, reporting from the Doctor Who Pop Up Shop in Newtown.

References

External links
Official website
YouTube
Twitter
Facebook

Nine News
Current affairs shows